Carl Wilhelm Jessen (10 July 1764 – 30 March 1823) was a Danish naval officer and Governor of St Thomas in the Danish West Indies.

Career
Carl Wilhelm Jessen was a Danish-Norwegian naval officer and the son of Councillor of State Nicolai Jacob Jessen and Marie Christine Jacobi.

Jessen became a naval cadet in 1776. He was commissioned as a junior lieutenant in the navy in 1782, and then was promoted senior lieutenant in 1789, commander in 1796, captain in 1803, senior captain in 1810, and commodore in 1815. He left naval service as a rear admiral in 1822.  He then became Governor of the island of St Thomas in the Danish West Indies.

Ships and actions
 
Immediately after his lieutenant's examination, Jessen joined an expedition to the Caribbean with the small Lærken, where he participated in an engagement against two British privateers.

Between 1784 and 1786 Jessen participated in commercial trading voyages with (Danish) West India Company ships as first mate.

In 1789 he was a tutor at the Naval Cadet Academy and commander of a gunboat in Admiral Conrad von Schindel's squadron in the Baltic Sea. In 1790, as captain of Makrellen, he performed reconnaissance for the squadron.

During the period 1793–94 he was the deputy commander of the brig  (built 1791) under Captain H. Kaas. They operated in the Caribbean, where Jessen also participated in battles against privateers.
 
In 1795, Jessen was second-in-command of the frigate Thetis. For at least part of the period 1795 to 1799 Thetis was active in the Mediterranean protecting Danish shipping interests. Although Thetis was not present at the battle of 16 May 1797, she had been at Tripoli before – with a bribe for the Bey – and later with a squadron.
 
In 1799 and 1800 Jessen was second in command of the Naval Academy, and later served in a cutter in Norwegian waters protecting the country's neutrality. As captain of Lougen he again sailed to the West Indies. There he also had the schooners Iresine and Den Aarvaagne under his command. On 1 September 1800 he captured the British privateer Eagle, which had been raiding Danish merchant shipping.

This was the ”Slaget ved Fugleklippen” or the Battle of West Kay. When the Danes surrendered the islands he had to surrender all three of his ships to the British and sailed home with them to Europe. Upon his return to Copenhagen King Christian VII bestowed on him a gold sword in recognition of his fight against the British.

In 1803–1804 he was again in the Danish West Indies, this time as captain of the (small) frigate Frederickssteen.  Part of his remit was to act for the government of the Danish West Indies on all questions of naval service and maritime defence.

In 1807 Jessen became captain of the ship-of-the-line Prinds Christian Frederick, which together with the ship-of-the-line Louisa Augusta  and the brig  (built 1805), spent that year in Norwegian waters and thus avoided being captured by the British when they seized the whole of the rest of the Dano-Norwegian navy at the Battle of Copenhagen.

In December 1807 Jessen returned to Øresund with 200 of his crew on the sick list, and with a ship that badly needed maintenance as it had been so long at sea. However, in March 1808 Jessen received orders to proceed to the Great Belt to chase away the British warships there, as the Danish government wanted to transfer Spanish troops in French service unhindered from Funen to Zealand

Meanwhile, in Copenhagen it was noted that a large British force had arrived off Hornbæk (north Zealand) so Admiral Bille sent Jessen written instructions to attempt to return to Øresund by sailing south around Zealand – but the message arrived too late. The British ships-of-the-line off Hornbæk had meanwhile become aware of his departure and began searching for him the same day.

At 2 pm Prins Christian Frederick observed two British ships-of-the-line approaching from the east, and Jessen realised that a decisive battle was at hand.

Jessen did not want to retreat before the British south through the Great Belt as he did not want to draw the British forces down there, so he kept course for the reef off Zealand Point – hoping to be able to slip past and back to Øresund.  The wind was variable and failing, frustrating his plan. The battle commenced at 7:30 pm on the eastern side of Zealand Point.

After nearly three hours fighting Jessen was forced to strike, but he was now so close to land that he could run his ship aground. Only in the nick of time did the British ships avoid grounding.  In this sea battle, in addition to the 61 men killed and 129 wounded, the Danes lost three officers killed – one of them Lieutenant Peter Willemoes (a Danish hero of the 1801 battle of Copenhagen). British losses were five killed and 44 wounded.

As the British could not manage to refloat Prins Christian Frederick, they set fire to her the next day. The Danish dead were buried in the churchyard at Odden, where an appropriate monument can still be found. Jessen, who was himself wounded in the fight, was taken to Gothenburg where he was exchanged, and where the British ships were repaired.

For the rest of the war Jessen commanded the Trekroner Fort (at the northern approach to Copenhagen harbour), together with a division of gunboats.

In 1815 Jessen sailed by private ship to the West Indies where in 1822, after his retirement from the Navy, he became Governor of St. Thomas. He remained Governor until his death on 30 March 1823.

Personal life
 
On 27 August 1794, Jessen married Anne Margrethe Erichsen (8 December 1764 – 27 December 1845), daughter of senior civil servant Jon Erichsen. He was the elder brother of author and translator Juliane Marie Jessen. He is buried at St Thomas, where there is still a memorial, although his body was later was disinterred and removed to the naval Holmens Cemetery in Copenhagen, på Holmen in Copenhagen in 1901.

Notes
''This article contains material translated from the Danish article: Carl Wilhelm Jessen

References

18th-century Danish naval officers
19th-century Danish naval officers
Royal Dano-Norwegian Navy personnel
Royal Danish Navy counter admirals
Royal Danish Naval Academy alumni
Academic staff of Royal Danish Naval Academy
1764 births
1823 deaths
Danish military commanders of the Napoleonic Wars
Napoleonic Wars prisoners of war held by the United Kingdom
People from Fredensborg Municipality
19th century in the Danish West Indies
19th-century Danish military personnel
Burials at Holmen Cemetery